Sanoma Corporation (formerly SanomaWSOY) is Finland's largest media group and the leading European education publisher. The company has media business in Finland and a learning business in twelwe European countries, including  Belgium, the Netherlands, Poland, Sweden, Norway, Italy and Spain, among others. The company is headquartered in Helsinki. At the end of 2021, Sanoma had approximately 4,800 employees.

Description
The story of Sanoma begins in 1889 with the establishment of the newspaper Päivälehti in Finland. SanomaWSOY was formed in 1999 with the merger of Sanoma Corporation, WSOY (Werner Söderström Osakeyhtiö; Werner Söderström Corporation) and Helsinki Media Company. The group reverted to the name Sanoma Corporation in October 2008. Today Sanoma is a Learning and Media company.

Sanoma operates in eleven European countries. In 2019, net sales totalled €900m. Sanoma shares are listed on Nasdaq Helsinki.

The company consists of two divisions:
 Sanoma Learning: Educational publishing and services in twelve European countries
 Sanoma Media Finland: newspaper and magazine publishing, printing, TV, radio, events, online gaming services. The newspaper Helsingin Sanomat that was founded in 1889 as Päivälehti is one of the single most significant products of the group. Nelonen Media, which belongs to the group, has four television channels and several radio channels. In 2020, Sanoma acquired Alma Media's regional news media, the largest of which were Aamulehti and Satakunnan Kansa. The CEO of Sanoma Media Finland is Pia Kalsta.

In October 2020, Sanoma acquired the Spanish educational publisher Grupo Santillana and in 2022 the Italian and German education businesses from Pearson.

References

1999 establishments in Finland
Companies established in 1999
Publishing companies established in 1999
Companies based in Helsinki
Companies listed on Nasdaq Helsinki
Mass media companies of Finland
Newspaper companies
Magazine publishing companies
Mass media in Helsinki
Disney comics publishers